Strelka is a rural locality (a settlement) in Solovyovsky Selsoviet of Tyndinsky District, Amur Oblast, Russia. The population was 1 as of 2018.

Geography 
It is located 9 km north from Solovyovsk.

References 

Rural localities in Tyndinsky District